Novopokrovka is a rural locality (a selo) and the administrative center of Krasnoarmeysky District of Primorsky Krai, Russia, located in the west of the district on the Bolshaya Ussurka River,  north-northeast of Vladivostok (in a straight line). Population:

History
It was founded in 1903.

References

Rural localities in Primorsky Krai